Jack Wall (born 1 July 1945) is a former Irish Labour Party politician who served as a Teachta Dála (TD) for the Kildare South constituency from 1997 to 2016 and a Senator from 1993 to 1997, after being nominated by the Taoiseach.

Wall was born in Castledermot, County Kildare in 1945. He was educated at Castledermot National School and Castledermot Vocational School. He worked as an electrician before entering into local politics in 1991 when he was elected to Athy Town Council and Kildare County Council.

In 1993, Wall was nominated to Seanad Éireann. He was first elected to Dáil Éireann as a Labour Party TD for Kildare South at the 1997 general election, and was re-elected at each subsequent general election until his retirement in 2016. He previously served as Labour Party Spokesperson for Agriculture, Defence and Arts, Sport and Tourism, and also for Community and Rural Affairs.

He was the chairperson of the Parliamentary Labour Party from 2007 to 2016.

On 10 July 2015, he announced that he would not be contesting the 2016 general election.

References

External links
Jack Wall's page on the Labour Party website

 

1945 births
Living people
Labour Party (Ireland) TDs
Local councillors in County Kildare
Members of the 20th Seanad
Members of the 28th Dáil
Members of the 29th Dáil
Members of the 30th Dáil
Members of the 31st Dáil
Politicians from County Kildare
Nominated members of Seanad Éireann
Labour Party (Ireland) senators